Harry McGurk (23 February 1936 – 17 April 1998) was a British cognitive psychologist. He is known for his discovery of the McGurk effect, described in a 1976 paper with his research assistant John MacDonald, while he was a senior developmental psychologist at the University of Surrey.

Biography
McGurk was born in Hillington, Glasgow on 23 February 1936. After training at the University of Glasgow, he became a probation officer in Edinburgh.

He married Betty Hannah. She was invited to go out to the Church of Scotland mission in Nigeria to use her accountancy skills and for two years he became involved with the management of the school and hospital.

On their return, he studied psychology at University of Strathclyde, gaining a BA, an MSc, and a PhD for his seminal work on infant perception.

Following a period as a Research Fellow at Princeton University, he joined the University of Surrey, as a lecturer in child development and later was appointed to a personal chair in the same subject.

Between 1990 and 1994 he was Director of the Thomas Coram Research Unit at the Institute of Education, University of London.  In 1994, he was appointed as Director of the Australian Institute of Family Studies in Melbourne.

Harry McGurk died on 17 April 1998, in Melbourne, aged 62, from complications after a heart operation.

Publications
The economic cost of child abuse and neglect in South Australia. 1998
Staff-child ratios in care and education services for young children. 1995
Project Charlie : an evaluation of a life skills drug education programme for primary schools. 1995
Childhood social development : contemporary perspectives / edited by Harry McGurk. 1992
Developmental psychology and the vision of speech. 1988
What next? 1987
Brain and behavioural development: interdisciplinary perspectives on structure and function / edited by Harry McGurk and John W. T. Dickerson. 1982
Issues in childhood social development / edited by Harry McGurk. 1978
 Ecological factors in human development by International Society for the Study of Behavioural Development. Conference (3rd: 1975: University of Surrey). 1977
Growing and changing : a primer of developmental psychology. 1975
PhD Thesis: Oriental discrimination in infancy and early childhood. University of Strathclyde. Dept. of Psychology. Thesis, 1971

References

British psychologists
Academics of the University of Surrey
1936 births
1998 deaths
People in health professions from Glasgow
Alumni of the University of Strathclyde
Princeton University fellows
Academics of the UCL Institute of Education
20th-century psychologists